The Jama Masjid Nerul or Nerul Aalami Markaz is a mosque located in Nerul, Navi Mumbai, Maharashtra, India. It is the oldest, largest mosque in Nerul & one of the main mosques of Navi Mumbai. It serves as the headquarter for the shura faction of the Tablighi Jamaat and is led by scholars like Ahmad Laat and Ebrahim Dewla.

The leadership of the Tablighi Jamat was split in 2015 when Muhammad Saad Kandhlawi claimed to be the sole leader of Tablighi Jamat. It ended up in two groups, one being headed by Kandhlawi at Nizamuddin Markaz Mosque and other being headed by the shura, with its place at Nerul, Maharashtra.

Architecture 
The Jama Masjid was established in 1995 and recently  became a three-storied building. It has no pillars inside the main prayer hall and can accommodate 2000~ people for daily prayers and 5000~ people on Eid prayers.

Overview
The mosque is also known as "Masjid-E-Tabligh" and serves as the headquarter for "shura" faction of the Tablighi Jamaat in India.

2015 leadership controversy

In 2015, the Tablighi Jamat split into two, making Jama Masjid Nerul a center for the "shura group", and Nizamuddin Markaz Mosque being headed by Muhammad Saad Kandhlawi. The shura group is led by Ebrahim Dewla, Ahmed Laat and others.

See more
Kakrail Mosque
Raiwind Markaz
Ijtema
Bishwa Ijtema
Tablighi Jamaat

References

External links

Mosques in Mumbai
Indo-Islamic architecture
Tablighi Jamaat
Nerul